Jim Sadler (28 July 1886 – 19 July 1975) was an Australian rules footballer who played for Collingwood in the Victorian Football League (VFL).

Sadler played in 135 games over ten years for Collingwood in the VFL. He was Collingwood's back pocket player in the 1910 Grand Final win over Carlton.

Sadler also played in Collingwood's losing Grand Final teams in 1911 and 1915.

References

External links

 
 

1886 births
Collingwood Football Club players
Collingwood Football Club Premiership players
Australian rules footballers from Victoria (Australia)
1975 deaths
One-time VFL/AFL Premiership players